Petuh (Petu) is a mixed language of Flensburg, a mixture of German, Low German, Danish, and Southern Jutish spoken in Flensburg on the German–Danish border. It is High German in vocabulary (with some Danish concepts and loan translations), but it has Danish and Low Saxon grammar and syntax. It originated in the 19th century and was still vibrant in the 1950s, but it is now on the verge of extinction. 

The owners of such season tickets were known as petuhtants and were mostly older women who met on the excursion boats and in the cafes along the fjord.

References

Karl Nielsen Bock, 1933. "Niederdeutsch auf dänischem Substrat." Studien zur Dialektgeographie Südostschleswigs. Copenhagen and Marburg.

External links
Petuh at Ostsee.de

Languages of Germany
Mixed languages
Germanic languages
Languages attested from the 19th century
Flensburg